Sir John Finch (1626–1682) was ambassador of England to the Ottoman Empire.

One of the Finches of Burley-on-the-Hill, John Finch was the younger brother of Lord Chancellor Sir Heneage Finch, 1st Earl of Nottingham; their half-sister was the philosopher Lady Anne Conway of Ragley Hall. Anne and John Finch were pupils of Henry More. After Eton John Finch studied with More at Christ's College, Cambridge, and there met his lifelong companion Sir Thomas Baines. Following a Grand Tour of Italy, where they graduated in medicine from the University of Padua in 1656 Finch and Baines returned to Christ's as teachers in 1660, and fellows of the Royal Society. They returned to Italy again from 1665 to 1670 when Finch was Minister to the Ducal Court at Florence. He was elected by the Company on the king's education on 7 November 1672.  Sir John was ambassador to the Sublime Porte of the Ottoman Empire in Constantinople, succeeding his uncle Heneage Finch, 3rd Earl of Winchilsea and his cousin Daniel Harvey arriving on 18 March 1674.  Finch was not a strong ambassador and was constantly outwitted by the Grand Viziers Ahmet Köprülü and Kara Mustafa  Other British residents during Finch's tenure included the Reverend John Covel, merchant Sir Dudley North, Finch's consul in Smyrna, Paul Rycaut and their letters and memoirs contribute to our picture of Finch's tenure as the diplomat in residence.  Finch and Baines are further remembered in the poem Baines His Dissection by Scottish poet, David Kinloch. He left Turkey on November 1681.

Sir John Finch died of pleurisy in Florence, Italy in 1682, is buried in Christ's College and commemorated with Baines, who had died in Constantinople, with an elaborate monument. Their portraits by Florentine artist Carlo Dolci hang in the Fitzwilliam Museum, Cambridge.

References

External links

Archibald Malloch, 'Sir John Finch and Sir Thomas Baines' Proc. R. Soc. Med. 1916; 9(Sect Hist Med): 155–158.  
Stefano Villani, 'Between Anatomy and Politics: John Finch and Italy, 1649-71,' in Margaret Pelling, Scott Mandelbrote (eds.), The Practice of Reform in Health, Medicine, and Science, 1500-2000'' (Aldershot: Ashgate, 2005), 151-166.

1626 births
1682 deaths
Ambassadors of England to the Ottoman Empire
University of Padua alumni
Original Fellows of the Royal Society
17th-century English diplomats
Alumni of Christ's College, Cambridge
John